Dromaeosauroides is a genus of dromaeosaurid theropod dinosaur from the Early Cretaceous of what is now Denmark and possibly also England. It was discovered in the Jydegaard Formation in the Robbedale valley, on the island of Bornholm in the Baltic Sea. This is the only likely place for dinosaur remains to be discovered on Danish territory, since the Mesozoic deposits exposed in the rest of the country are marine. Dromaeosauroides is the first known dinosaur from this location, and the only one which has been scientifically named. It is one of the oldest known dromaeosaurs in the world, and the first known uncontested dromaeosaur from the Early Cretaceous of Europe.

It is known from two teeth, the first of which was found in 2000 and the second in 2008. Based on the first tooth (the holotype), the genus and species Dromaeosauroides bornholmensis was named in 2003. The genus name means "Dromaeosaurus-like", due to the similarity to the teeth of that genus, and the species name means "from Bornholm". After this discovery, remains and tracks of more dinosaurs were found in several formations on Bornholm. Some teeth from the United Kingdom that have been referred to the genus Nuthetes may also belong to this animal. Coprolites containing fish remains found in the Jydegaard Formation may belong to Dromaeosauroides.

They are curved and finely serrated. As a dromaeosaur it would have been feathered, and had a large sickle claw on its feet like its relatives Dromaeosaurus and Deinonychus. It lived in a coastal lagoon environment with sauropods, as evidenced by a possible titanosaur tooth.

Discovery and naming

Few dinosaur remains have been found in Scandinavia. The mainland of western Denmark is an unlikely region to find dinosaur remains, since the Mesozoic sediments there are marine Maastrichtian chalk. Fossils of non-dinosaurian marine animals, including mosasaurs and plesiosaurs, have been found in these deposits. Mesozoic deposits in Scania, Sweden, are much richer in fossils, including those of dinosaurs. The Danish island of Bornholm in the Baltic Sea was part of the same land mass as Scania (the Scandinavian-Russian continent), and has a similar geology. The southwestern part of the island is the only place in Denmark which has yielded dinosaur remains.

During the 1990s, the Fossil Project (disbanded in 2005) was formed by a group of unemployed people who received funding from Denmark and the EEC to maintain geological sites on Bornholm. One of these, "Carl Nielsen's sandpit" in the Robbedale valley (not to be confused with the Robbedale Formation, where no vertebrate remains have been found), is part of the Jydegaard Formation. This formation is 140 million years old, dating to the Late Berriasian (or Ryazanian) stage of the Early Cretaceous period. The Fossil Project sifted sand at these sites in cooperation with the NaturBornholm interpretation centre, which exhibited the fossils discovered. In September 2000, Danish palaeontologists Per Christiansen and Niels Bonde taught a field course at the site, "The Hunt for Danish Dinosaurs". During the course, geology student Eliza Jarl Estrup found a theropod tooth, the first dinosaur discovered on Danish territory, and the find was recorded by a local television station.

The tooth was presented at the 45th annual meeting of the Palaeontological Association in 2001, and identified as a dromaeosaur. In 2003 the tooth (MGUH 27218/DK 315) was made the holotype specimen of Dromaeosauroides bornholmensis—named and described by Christiansen and Bonde. The genus name combines Dromaeosaurus with the Greek  ("in the form of"), referring to the resemblance between the teeth of the two genera. The specific name refers to Bornholm. The name Dromaeosaurus itself has been translated as "swift" or "running reptile". Bonde and Christiansen had expected the first Danish dinosaur remains to be teeth of herbivorous dinosaurs such as hypsilophodonts or Iguanodon, and were surprised to find a dromaeosaur tooth instead, since these are rare in Early Cretaceous formations; herbivores would have been more abundant than carnivores. Because the dromaeosaur seems to have been large, they expected that resilient bones, such as claws, might be found in the future. The palaeontologists did not expect bones of larger dinosaurs to be discovered in the formation (since these would most likely have been found when the sand was commercially exploited), but hoped the remains of a Mesozoic mammal would be found. The holotype tooth has been illustrated in several books and research articles. It was certified "Danekræ" ("Danish creature", according to a 1990 Danish museum law securing important fossils) when its scientific importance was evaluated by the Geological Museum in Copenhagen.

In late summer 2008, ranger Jens Kofoed found a second dromaeosaurid tooth. This specimen (DK 559) was found in the same location, and later assigned to D. bornholmensis as well. Kofoed explained that the finds were surprising because people had been unsuccessfully searching for dinosaur remains in Denmark for years, and it was like finding a "needle in a haystack". In a press release, the second dromaeosaur tooth was also certified Danekræ by the Natural History Museum of Denmark, which compared the animal to the raptors in the film Jurassic Park, noting that the animals, unlike the film's raptors, would have been feathered.

Since the discovery of Dromaeosauroides, evidence of more dinosaurs has been found on Bornholm. In 2002, a tooth thought to belong to a juvenile titanosaurian sauropod was found in the Jydegaard Formation. Footprints of a sauropod and a thyreophoran were reported from the Middle Jurassic Bagå Formation in 2005. Small dromaeosaur and indeterminate maniraptoran teeth from the Early Cretaceous Rabekke Formation were reported in 2008, and sauropod tracks were also reported from the formation that year. In 2011, footprints of a sauropod, a thyreophoran and a theropod were reported from the Bagå Formation. Lower Jurassic tracks reported form the Rønne Formation on Bornholm in 2014 are the earliest evidence of dinosaur activity in Denmark. A tooth from the multituberculate Sunnyodon was found in the Rabekke Formation in 2004, making it the first known Danish and Scandinavian Mesozoic mammal.

In 2012, Jesper Milàn and colleagues described two coprolites (fossilised faeces) containing fish scales and bones. They were found in the Jydegaard Formation, the first such fossils found in Danish continental Mesozoic deposits. Although the producer of these faeces cannot be identified with certainty, marine turtles and dromaeosaurids such as Dromaeosauroides are the most likely candidates.

Description

Fossil theropod teeth are typically identified according to features including size, proportion, curvature of the crown and the morphology and number of denticles (serrations). The front part of the tooth was worn, indicating that it was shed when the animal was alive. It was further affected by taphonomic wear; the base of the tooth is irregular, so it may have been slightly longer in life. The curvature and length of the holotype tooth and the length of its hindmost cutting edge (carina) indicates it was in the front of the jaw.

The tooth is recurved with a backward bend, and is oval in cross-section. Its front and back cutting edges are finely serrated, extending two-thirds down each edge. There are six denticles per millimeter (0.04 in), and each denticle is square and chiseled. The overall form of the tooth, its width and shape in cross-section and its curvature resemble those in the maxilla (upper jawbone) and mandible of the species Dromaeosaurus albertensis from North America. Blood grooves are indistinct or absent, also similar to Dromaeosaurus, and differing from members of the Velociraptorinae subfamily. Dromaeosauroides differs from Dromaeosaurus in that the cutting edge at the front side is further from the middle of the tooth. Although the tooth is larger and the denticles similar, each denticle was smaller than those of Dromaeosaurus, which had only 13–20 denticles per , instead of Dromaeosauroides''' 30. The second known tooth is smaller——with the same features as the holotype.

As a dromaeosaur, Dromaeosauroides would have had a large sickle claw on its highly mobile second toe, like its relatives Dromaeosaurus, Velociraptor and Deinonychus. That group is closely related to birds, and the NaturBornholm interpretive centre houses a roughly life-sized sculpture of Dromaeosauroides covered in feathers. Later Chinese finds of well-preserved feathered dromaeosaurs indicate that the sculpture should have more and longer feathers to be accurate. Although some smaller dromaeosaurs may have been able to fly, flight was unlikely for an animal the size of Dromaeosauroides.

Classification

Several features of the tooth are only known from members of the family Dromaeosauridae of theropod dinosaurs. Dromaeosauroides was classified as a member of the Dromaeosaurinae subfamily within the Dromaeosauridae, due to its similarity to Dromaeosaurus. Despite the resemblance, Dromaeosauroides is not considered part of that genus. It is unlikely that a genus would survive for 60 million years; Dromaeosauroides lived during the Early Cretaceous, and Dromaeosaurus during the Late Cretaceous. The differences between their denticles also indicate they should be kept separate.

According to Bonde, Dromaeosauroides is one of the oldest known dromaeosaurs in the world; older remains, for the most part, have only tentatively been referred to Dromaeosauridae. Dromaeosauroides was the first definite dromaeosaurid known from the Early Cretaceous of Europe, depending on the identity of Nuthetes from the Middle Purbeck formation of the United Kingdom (which may slightly predate the Jydegaard Formation). It is uncertain whether the juvenile holotype specimen of Nuthetes has dromaeosaurid characteristics. Large specimens referred to Nuthetes appear to belong to true dromaeosaurs, and may belong to Dromaeosauroides rather than Nuthetes. These specimens measure . Dromaeosauroides has been considered an indeterminate dromaeosaur by some scientists. Bonde responded that since the teeth differ from those of other dromaeosaurs from the Early Cretaceous (and later members of the group, including Dromaeosaurus), it should be considered valid. He also said that these scientists had provided incorrect information about the location, strata and age of the specimen, and that the circumstances of its naming were no different from those of other tooth-based taxa. The German palaeontologist Oliver W. M. Rauhut and colleagues cautioned in 2010 that theropod teeth from the Late Jurassic/Early Cretaceous similar to those of dromaeosaurids may instead have belonged to the small tyrannosauroid Proceratosaurus or related taxa.

Palaeoenvironment
 
Only a corner of the Jydegaard Formation is exposed today; the remainder is overgrown. Jydegaard is part of the Nyker Group, which includes three formations (Rabekke, Robbedale and Jydegaard) ranging from the Berriasian to the Valanginian ages of the Early Cretaceous. Jydegaard consists of sediments deposited in a fresh-to-brackish lagoon facing a coastal strip. In addition to Dromaeosauroides and a possible titanosaur, remains of hybodont sharks, fish such as Lepidotes and Pleuropholis, turtles, lizards, the crocodile Pholidosaurus and thin bone fragments from birds or pterosaurs have been found in the deposit. The bivalve Neomiodon is found in abundance in the sediments below (the Neomiodon Bed), indicating mass mortality, perhaps due to dinoflagellate toxins.

The fish and bivalves were found in clay which was probably a lagoon, and the dinosaurs and lizards in sand which probably was land, perhaps a beach; turtles and crocodiles were found in both. Freshwater snails were found in clay that may have been shallow, drying lakes behind a sandy barrier between lagoon and sea, in a setting perhaps similar to the Florida Keys or the southwestern coast of Jutland. Dinosaurs may have fed there, based on the remains of plants and small land animals, and theropods may have hunted along the shore. Bornholm and Scania appear to be the only places were remains of the Scandinavian-Russian fauna of the Early Cretaceous can be found. Further investigations there may show whether this fauna has European or Asian affinities.

Based on possible dromaeosaur coprolites from the Jydegaard Formation, which contained scales of the fish Lepidotes, Milàn and colleagues speculated that some dromaeosaurids were able to catch fish with the enlarged sickle claw on the second digit of the foot, similar to the "spear fishing" that has been proposed for the theropod Baryonyx'' and its enlarged thumb claw. The larger of the two coprolites has evidence of coprophagous organisms.

See also

 Timeline of dromaeosaurid research

References

External links
 "Danish Dinosaurs" site by Geocenter Møns Klint

Eudromaeosaurs
Early Cretaceous dinosaurs of Europe
Fossil taxa described in 2003
2003 in Denmark
Bornholm